Euproctosia is a genus of moths in the subfamily Arctiinae. It contains the single species Euproctosia cretata, which is found in Ghana.

References

Natural History Museum Lepidoptera generic names catalog

Endemic fauna of Ghana
Lithosiini